Eaglehawk railway station is located on the Piangil line in Victoria, Australia. It serves the north-western Bendigo suburb of Eaglehawk, and it opened on 19 September 1876.

A pedestrian subway once existed at the Up end of the station, until it was filled in and replaced with a pedestrian crossing in 1967.

The Eaglehawk–Kerang electric staff section was replaced with staff and ticket in 1987. In 1989, the signal box, interlocking and goods yard at the station was abolished. A former goods shed and a small disused platform is located opposite the station.

In 2020, the station underwent a refurbishment, including new car park spaces and drop-off zones, an upgraded forecourt and an extension to the platform at the Up end of the station.

Located approximately 1km west of the station is the junction of the Piangil line and the disused Eaglehawk–Inglewood line.

Platforms and services

Eaglehawk has one platform. It is serviced by terminating V/Line Bendigo line services from Southern Cross, and through Swan Hill line services between Swan Hill and Southern Cross.

Platform 1:
 weekday services to Southern Cross; terminating services
 services to Southern Cross and Swan Hill

Transport links

Eaglehawk is served by V/Line Bendigo – Swan Hill and Mildura road coach services.

Gallery

References

External links

Victorian Railway Stations gallery
Melway map at street-directory.com.au

Regional railway stations in Victoria (Australia)
Transport in Bendigo
Bendigo